The FIVB Volleyball Men's U23 World Championship was the world championship of volleyball for male players under the age of 23 organized by Fédération Internationale de Volleyball (FIVB).

The first edition was staged in 2013 in Uberlândia, Brazil and tournaments were played every two years until 2017. The last tournament was hosted by Egypt in Cairo and won by Argentina. After not announcing a host for the 2019 edition, FIVB declared that "As per decision of May 2019 FIVB Board of Administration, the U23 WCH has been abolished."

A corresponding tournament for female players was the FIVB Volleyball Women's U23 World Championship.

Results summary

Medals summary

Appearance

Legend
 – Champions
 – Runners-up
 – Third place
 – Fourth place
 – Did not enter / Did not qualify
 – Hosts

MVP by edition
2013 – 
2015 – 
2017 –

See also

FIVB Volleyball Women's U23 World Championship
FIVB Volleyball Men's World Championship
FIVB Volleyball Men's U21 World Championship
FIVB Volleyball Boys' U19 World Championship

References

 
International men's volleyball competitions
Volleyball
Youth volleyball
Biennial sporting events
Recurring sporting events established in 2013
Recurring sporting events disestablished in 2019